Shkedei marak, known as mandlakh in Yiddish, or as "soup mandels" in the United States, is an Israeli food product consisting of crisp mini crouton used as a soup accompaniment. Shkedei marak are small yellow squares made from flour and palm oil. As a parve product, they can be used in either meat or cream soups. Despite the name, they contain no almonds.

Etymology
The word mandlach is the plural diminutive of mandel, which means "almond" in German and Yiddish. The word "shkedei" is the plural form of "shaked", which means "almond" in Hebrew, and "marak" is the Hebrew word for soup.

History
Although today shkedei marak are manufactured, they are based on the homemade crispy-fried squares of dough known as mandlach traditionally served with  chicken soup by Ashkenazi Jews.

Marketing
For many years Osem was the exclusive manufacturer of shkedei marak in Israel, but today the product is also marketed by other food companies, such as Vita and Knorr. Davidovich Bakery & Sons located near Haifa also produces and packages soup almonds under a variety of brand names. Over the years, food companies have experimented with different shapes for shkedei marak, including stars, rings, and little fish. In addition to their use in soups, shkedei marak are eaten plain as a snack food.

See also
Israeli cuisine
Oyster cracker
Saltine

References

External links
  Osem website

Israeli cuisine
Snack foods
Israeli inventions